WCSU may refer to:

 Western Connecticut State University
 WCSU-FM, a radio station (88.9 FM) licensed to Wilberforce, Ohio, United States